The Wonnerup massacre, also known as the Wonnerup "Minninup" massacre , was the killing of dozens of Waadandi Noongar people by European settlers in the vicinity of Wonnerup, Western Australia in February 1841. The massacre on Waadandi-Doonan land in the south-west of Western Australia took place after Gaywal/Gaywaar, a Waadandi Man, speared and killed George Layman, a settler at Wonnerup on 21 February 1841. The leaders of the punitive massacre were Layman's neighbours John Bussell and Captain John Molloy, resident magistrate of the district. Settlers from the Wonnerup, Capel, Busselton and Augusta area joined them to commit "one of the most bloodthirsty deeds ever committed by Englishmen".

Causes of conflict
The causes of conflict between colonial settlers and Waadandi Noongar people are many. One incident that caused a great deal of resentment between Gaywal and the settlers in the Busselton area was the treatment of Gaywal's son-in-law Nungundung. In November 1840 Henry Campbell, a settler labourer living on the Collie River, raped Gaywal's daughter and Nungundung, her husband, killed him with the help of two friends. The resident magistrate of the Leschenault district, G. Eliot had them flogged for this and let them go. Bussell was incensed at this lenient treatment and when he came across Nungundung he had him arrested, detained him for a while at his house Cattle Chosen and then sent him up to Perth for further punishment. There was much resentment at this arbitrary treatment of Nundundung amongst the Waadandi people after this incident and several threats were made to various settlers in the Busselton district during the following months.

Death of George Layman
On 21 February 1841 eighteen Waadandi people, including Gaywal, Milligan, and Gaywal's/Gaywar's son Woberdung were working for George Layman, helping with the threshing of wheat. White settler labourers who were also helping with the work were Martin Welch and John Dawson. Mary Bryan was working as a servant in the Layman cottage with Mrs Layman. 

Milligan and Gaywal (also known as Gaywar and "Quibean" in various sources of the time) had an argument over the damper they were given as payment at the end of the day. The Aboriginal workers were standing around a fire outside the Layman cottage at this point. Milligan went to the cottage to complain to George Layman that Gaywal had taken his share of damper and that he had nothing for his work. Layman then came out of the cottage and told Gaywal to give the damper to Milligan, grabbing Gaywal's beard in the process, a great insult in Noongar culture. Gaywal then stepped back said "George!" and speared Layman, who ran into his cottage, calling for a gun, then laid down on the floor and died within ten minutes. Young Robert Heppingstone, son of Mary Bryan, later said that he also saw Wobudung throw a spear that went between Layman's legs. All the Noongar workers then ran away.

Heppingstone was sent on horse to alert the Bussell family and Molloy of Layman's death. They were at the Bussell's house having a prayer meeting at the time as it was a Sunday. Milligan also went to the Bussell's house to report on what had happened.

First punitive expedition
On 22 February Dr Green came to ascertain the cause of Layman's death. Bussell and Molloy prepared warrants. They also prevailed on Bunny, a Noongar constable, to help, by holding him at the Bussell residence "until a conviction that he was true and zealous induced us to liberate him". Two young Noongar boys, described as spies, were caught at Wonnerup and told settlers that Gaywal had been speared in the thigh at Mollakup. The Bussells and Molloy went out at midnight towards Mollakup with Bunny as guide. The party comprised 13 people. After a day and a night, hiding in the sandhills and tracking a group of Noongar people, the settlers killed seven Noongar people and captured thirteen women and children. Gaywal was not part of the group of people killed or captured.

The Bussells and other settlers then returned home. At that time Symmons, the Protector of Aborigines arrived and apparently was roundly abused by the settlers. The Noongar prisoners told the Bussells and Molloy that Gaywal was retreating westward. A small party led by Vernon Bussell and three other settlers remained at Wonnerup. On 27 February Vernon sent a message saying "bring ammunition we have none". Charles Bussell was sent out with weapons and reinforcements. Vernon Bussell then returned and reported that any Noongar guides they recruited were giving them conflicting information about Gaywal's whereabouts. Bunny had also been sent out to kill Gaywal and came back reporting that he had done this, but this was not so.

On 26 February Fanny Bussell noted in her diary: "In the evening John, Capt. Molloy and Mr. Northy returned. Capt. Molloy drank tea here. 7 natives killed. Gaywal supposed to be wounded."

Second larger punitive massacre
On 27 February a larger massacre occurred. It was led by Molloy and John Bussell and comprised Charles, Vernon and Alfred Bussell and other settlers from the wider Busselton area. Warren Bert Kimberly wrote an account of it in 1897 after talking to colonial settlers and Noongar survivors who remembered what happened. It is said that Molloy gave orders that no women or children were to be killed. The majority of Noongar people were now hiding around Lake Minninup. Then:

Oral history of the Waadandi Doonan people also says:

Cover-up of events
This massacre was later "systematically downplayed" by settlers despite large numbers of Noongar people being unaccounted for after the event. A descendant of John Dawson has stated that something dreadful occurred "which seriously affected the moral of the whole community". Governor John Hutt was in charge of the Swan River Colony at the time and the settler community closed ranks against further enquiry. Molloy's reports to Hutt at this time are also missing. Fanny Bussell's diary of that period in February is missing four pages, although this has been attributed by Edward Shann to wanting to conceal the argument with Symmons that occurred at the time.

Death of Gaywal
On 7 March, Gaywal was killed by Lieutenant Northey's servant Kelly. He was at the forefront of a party that had gone out to continue the hunt for Gaywal. Later on, Molloy set up a trap for Woberdung and his brother Kenny on the boat of Captain Plaskett. They were then taken to Rottnest Island to be incarcerated.

References

Further reading

1841 in Australia
February 1841 events
Massacres in 1841
Massacres of Indigenous Australians
Noongar
Busselton